Hals or HALS may refer to:

Hals (surname)
Hals Municipality, now in Aalborg, Region Nordjylland, Denmark
Hals, Denmark
Hals (Passau) the northernmost neighborhood of Passau, Germany
Historic American Landscapes Survey, a program of the United States National Park Service
HIV-associated lipodystrophy syndrome, a condition characterized by loss of subcutaneous fat associated with infection with HIV
Hindered amine light stabilizers, chemicals that prevent light-induced degradation of polymers
Hertfordshire Archives and Local Studies
 Hals (crater), a crater on Mercury

See also
 Halls (disambiguation)
 Hals Pass
 Halže